In Search of Schrödinger's Cat: Quantum Physics and Reality is a 1984 book on quantum theory by the physicist John Gribbin, discussing in layman's terms its logic and many interpretations.

Summary
Gribbin explains the body of evidence leading up to the development of quantum physics and summarises the historical context in which it occurred. He explores in detail the mysteries surrounding quantum physics and the implications of the theory. Throughout the book, Gribbin refers to a body of experimental evidence to support the theory and to aid the reader's understanding. He also uses thought experiments to help the reader understand the crucial concepts and interpretations of quantum physics, including of course Schrödinger's cat. Finally, Gribbin explores the philosophical implications of the theory, and leaves the reader with loose ends.

Sequel
In the sequel to this book, Schrödinger's Kittens and the Search for Reality (1995), Gribbin tries to tie these loose ends together with his interpretation of string theory.

References

1984 non-fiction books
American non-fiction books
Books by John Gribbin
English-language books
Popular physics books
Random House books
Schrödinger's cat